Herri met de Bles, also known as Henri Blès, Herri de Dinant, Herry de Patinir, and il Civetta (c. 1490 – after 1566), was a Flemish Northern Renaissance and Mannerist landscape painter, native of Bouvignes or Dinant (both in present-day Belgium).

He contributed, along with Joachim Patinir and Lucas Gassel, to a distinct style of Northern Renaissance landscape painting basically originating from Gerard David's works and combining small history or religious scenes into compositions defined by perspective and atmospheric effects. They all painted landscapes seen from a high viewpoint and rocky masses.  They did not aim to create a realistic depiction but an atmospheric effect.  Herri met de Bles always included a few small figures involved in a religious episode or everyday activities such as mining, agriculture or trade.

Life

The Netherlands Institute for Art History suggests that de Bles was born in Dinant in circa 1510.
Very little is known about the artist. He is believed to be identical to a certain Herry de Patenir who joined Antwerp's Guild of St. Luke in 1533 as a painter. He may have been related to the landscape painter Joachim Patinir, perhaps as his nephew, although he may not have trained under him because of their age difference.

He may have visited Ferrara, Italy as an Italian source mentions it. But there is no other evidence to support this. His work was popular in Italy, where he was known as 'il Civetta' because of the little owl that often appears in his paintings, usually in a hollow tree or in a cavity between some rocks. The 17th-century biographer Karel van Mander regarded this motif as his signature. The name Herri met de Bles translates literally from Dutch as Herri with the blaze and was reportedly given him because of his characteristic white forelock. He may have been the pupil of Lucas Gassel, who was at least 10 years his senior. There are significant similarities between their works about the subject of David and Bathsheba are significant. Besides, they are depicted together (along with Hans Holbein) in a 1764 coloured engraving by Jan l'Admiral with Gassel being in the foreground and de Bles shown in the more obscure lower right corner.
The notname  of "Pseudo Bles" was invented to cover a number of Antwerp Mannerist paintings that had previously been attributed to de Bles, after it was recognised that this was wrong.  In 1915 by Max Jakob Friedländer in his work Die Antwerpener Manieristen von 1520, made a first attempt to put order in the growing number of works from the Netherlands that were catalogued under the 'name of embarrassment 'pseudo-Herri met de Bles' (usually now "Pseudo Bles").

The renowned Dutch art institute and research center, RKD places him as still active in Antwerp in 1566, based on recently discovered contemporary documents.

Work

His landscapes are different from Patinir's in that de Bles' work shows more foreground landscapes, a looser composition and greater detail. His choice of colours is generally less rich than that of Patinir.  Along with a group of Antwerp-based followers of Hieronymus Bosch that included Jan Mandyn, Pieter Huys, and Jan Wellens de Cock, de Bles brought the tradition of fantastic imagery into northern Mannerism.
Most of his sketches are in German public collections, namely in Berlin and Hamburg, one of them is stored in the Louvre, Paris. Most of his paintings are exhibited in Belgian museums (Namur, Antwerp etc.), besides in the museum of Naples and the Museum of Art History of Vienna. Other works are circulating among private collectors and auctions.

In popular culture
In Richard Powers's novel The Gold Bug Variations (1991), one of the main characters is working on a dissertation whose subject is Herri met de Bles. The painter's obscurity and his peculiar imagery are woven into the motifs of the novel.
In Olga Tokarczuk's novel "Empuzjon" one of the minor characters, a beaux arts student, is working on a PhD. thesis on Herri met de Bles.

Notes

References 
 Norman E. Muller (Ed.): Herri met de Bles: Studies and Explorations of the World Landscape Tradition. Brepols, Turnhout 1998, 
 Michel Weemans. "Herri met de Bles's sleeping peddler: an exegetical and anthropomorphic landscape". Art Bulletin, Sept 2006.
 Weemans, Michel. "Herri Met de Bles's Way to Calvary: A Silenic Landscape," Art History, 32,2 (2009), 307–331.

External links 

Long note on Landscape with the Conversion of Saul on the Road to Damascus, ca. 1545, Oberlin College 
Web Gallery of Art: Paintings by Herri met de Bles 

1510s births
16th-century deaths
Flemish Renaissance painters
Walloon people
Painters from Antwerp
Court painters